Pseudocharopa exquisita, also known as the exquisite pinwheel snail, is a species of pinwheel snail that is endemic to Australia's Lord Howe Island in the Tasman Sea.

Description
The ear-shaped shell of mature snails is 5.5–7 mm in height, with a diameter of 8.8–9.6 mm, with a moderately low spire, impressed sutures and whorls rounded with a supraperipheral sulcus. It has orange-brown and cream flammulations (flame-like markings). The umbilicus is very narrow, covered by the reflected lip. The ovately lunate aperture is distorted by a groove.

Habitat
The snail is only known from the summit of Mount Lidgbird, where it was found crawling on wet rock faces. It has not been seen since 1914, when it was collected in large numbers, and it may be extinct.

References

 
exquisita
Gastropods of Lord Howe Island
Taxa named by Alfred James Peile
Gastropods described in 1929